Jailto Bonfim (born 4 January 1964) is a Brazilian sprinter. He competed in the men's 100 metres at the 1988 Summer Olympics.

References

1964 births
Living people
Athletes (track and field) at the 1987 Pan American Games
Athletes (track and field) at the 1988 Summer Olympics
Brazilian male sprinters
Olympic athletes of Brazil
Place of birth missing (living people)
Pan American Games athletes for Brazil
20th-century Brazilian people